In geometry, the great deltoidal hexecontahedron (or great sagittal ditriacontahedron) is a nonconvex isohedral polyhedron. It is the dual of the nonconvex great rhombicosidodecahedron. It is visually identical to the great rhombidodecacron. It has 60 intersecting cross quadrilateral faces, 120 edges, and 62 vertices. Its faces are darts. Part of each dart lies inside the solid, hence is invisible in solid models.

It is also called a great strombic hexecontahedron.

Proportions 
The dihedral angle equals .

References

External links 
 
 Uniform polyhedra and duals

Dual uniform polyhedra